Manfred Losch (27 December 1938 – 1 November 2009) was a German athlete. He competed in the men's hammer throw at the 1960 Summer Olympics.

References

External links
 

1938 births
2009 deaths
Athletes (track and field) at the 1960 Summer Olympics
German male hammer throwers
Olympic athletes of the United Team of Germany
People from Angermünde
Sportspeople from Brandenburg